Boraras brigittae is a species of ray-finned fish in the genus Boraras, also known as chili rasboras or mosquito rasboras, are a very small species of fishes native to the swamps of South West Borneo, Indonesia.

Anatomy and appearance 
The females in this species are found to have round bellies and lighter coloring as compared to the male counterparts. While the males are brightly colored and attractive, they are smaller in size compared to the females in this species.

Diet 
They eat tiny organisms like worms and insects when out in the wild. You may give them pellets, frozen food, flakes, young brine shrimp, worms, and other micro sources of carnivorous protein while they're in your tank. They can also be fed a plant-based diet on occasion.

In the aquarium 
These fishes prefer an aquarium setting that is similar to their natural habitat and can live up to 8 years if properly cared for.

References 

Boraras
Freshwater fish of Borneo
Fish described in 1978